is a Japanese four-panel comic strip manga written and illustrated by Miyuki Nakayama. It made its first appearance in Houbunsha's Manga Time Kirara Carat magazine with the October 2013 issue. A 12-episode anime television series adaptation by A-1 Pictures aired from October to December 2017.

Plot 
High school girl  Maika Sakuranomiya has trouble finding a part-time job because of how scary she looks when smiling. However, she is scouted one day by an Italian man who is also the manager of Stile, a café where its waitresses are given unique traits such as tsundere and younger sister. Maika is given a sadistic trait because of her looks and has to adopt a dominant and cruel persona when servicing customers, particularly masochistic ones.

Characters 

Maika is a 16-year-old girl who has a positive and cheerful personality, and unintentionally gains a sadistic look in her eyes whenever she smiles. This look catches the attention of Dino, who scouts her to be the "sadistic girl" waitress at Café Stile. Despite being told that the customers like being treated badly, her worrying about how she is treating customers gets the better of her, causing her to snap into an apologetic personality as soon as they have left. She comes from a very traditional family and works part-time so she could study abroad using her own money. Her love of other countries also makes her develop an admiration towards Colonel Sanders (whom she refers to as the "old man from the chicken place") and Santa Claus. She adores Dino because of his blond hair but is oblivious to his crush on her.

Kaho is a 17-year-old waitress at Stile who acts as the tsundere.  Although she plays a tsunderish role, Kaho's real personality is that of a carefree and energetic person, although she retains somewhat of a tsundere dynamic with Kōyō. She has trouble keeping up her persona when customers are discussing video games, feeling the need to join in. She is currently the most popular waitress at Stile. It is hinted that she has feelings for Kōyō due to the comedic situations she gets in with him.

Mafuyu is another waitress at Stile who is actually a 20-year-old college student, but plays the younger sister character because of her petite figure. Her real personality is mature and rarely shows emotions, but easily gets excited whenever her favorite series, Aisatsu (Magical Frill in the anime), is involved. She has a younger brother who is taller than her, and she has always wanted a younger sister, although she will not include Kaho because of Kaho's body figure. Although she plays a younger sister character, she has a degree of contempt towards lolicons, and once turned down a customer who asked her out because she believed he was only interested in her because of her young appearance.

Miu is a waitress who fulfills the older sister trait. She usually wears glasses, although she wears contacts when at work at the café. She is 22 years old, and usually behaves elegantly; however, she is also dōjinshi artist in a group called "Hanazono Folder" that draws adult comics, and on occasion muses about scenarios for her dōjinshi with rather creepy details. After accidentally leaving one of her works at the café when she visited as a customer, Dino scouted her and she accepted to get inspiration for her dōjinshi. One of her hobbies is observing people, particularly the relationship between Dino and Maika; she even uses them as models in her dōjinshi, despite Dino's strong objection.

Hideri is a 16-year-old "waitress" who fulfills the idol trait. Hideri is actually a boy who dresses as a girl and aspires to become an idol. He works at Stile to gain fans; giving proof to his parents that he is talented, or else he has to inherit his family's farm. While he acts like a "cute" girl all the time, he can unintentionally become manly. Although friendly and energetic, he is also incredibly vain, and believes himself to be incredibly cute, often bragging about how much his alleged fanbase admires him. He is also very picky over clothes, preferring to wear cute and Gothic outfits instead of funny and sexy clothes, much to Miu's annoyance. He occasionally attempts to help Dino get closer to Maika; however, Dino usually ends up messing up the opportunity in one way or another.

Dino is a 26-year-old Italian manager of Stile and works in the kitchen. He loves anime girls and figurines, and often stays up late to watch late night anime. His nose bleeds whenever he gets excited. Due to his attraction for Japanese girls, particularly black-haired ones, he develops an open crush on Maika, although Maika herself is oblivious to this fact. Due to his eccentric personality, he is often accused by the other employees of being perverted, and on one occasion even gets arrested due to describing his attraction to Maika in public.

Kōyō is the 21-year-old chef at Stile who loves yuri and always wants to see female customers being friendly to each other to fire his imagination. Working at the same station as Dino, he has to work harder because the latter often slacks off. Like Kaho, he is also a gamer and later becomes more conscious of her. He often gets flustered whenever he inadvertently sees Kaho's breasts, and later develops somewhat of a tsundere dynamic with her.

Aika is Maika's older sister who dresses in a yamato nadeshiko manner. She often worries about Maika because of her scary eyes. Like her sister, Aika is a natural sadistic character. She mistakes Dino as Maika's boyfriend.

Kōichi is Aika and Maika's older brother who is recognizable from his black hair with bangs parted in the middle. Like his sisters, he is a natural sadistic character. He is worried about Maika who has few friends because of her scary eyes. He mistakes Dino as Maika's boyfriend.

Media

Manga 
Blend S is a four-panel comic strip manga written and illustrated by Miyuki Nakayama. It made its first appearance in Houbunsha's Manga Time Kirara Carat magazine with the October 2013 issue, and began serialization in the magazine with the March 2014 issue. The last chapter was published in the June issue on April 28, 2022. Eight tankōbon volumes of the manga have been released with the last on May 26, 2022. The manga was licensed in North America by Sol Press before it went out of business and left the translation unfinished with only one volume published.

Anime 
An anime television series adaptation, directed by Ryōji Masuyama and produced by A-1 Pictures, premiered on October 8, 2017. Gō Zappa supervised the series' scripts and Yōsuke Okuda designed the characters. Go Zappa wrote the screenplay, and Tomoki Kikuya composed the music. Aniplex of America licensed the anime for release in North America. The opening theme  and ending theme  are performed by Azumi Waki, Akari Kitō, and Anzu Haruno under the name Blend A (pronounced Blend Ace).

In November 2017, the opening theme of the series became a viral meme on Twitter and YouTube, which consists of adding an additional word to the opening part of the song: "Smile, Sweet, Sister, Sadistic, Surprise, Service...", followed by that word, which may refer to pop culture or another popular meme, regardless of whether it starts with the letter S or not.

Video game
Characters from the series appear alongside other Manga Time Kirara characters in the mobile RPG, Kirara Fantasia in 2018.

Notes

See also 
Spirits & Cat Ears – Another manga by the same author

References

External links 
 

2013 manga
2017 anime television series debuts
A-1 Pictures
Aniplex
Comedy anime and manga
Houbunsha manga
Seinen manga
Slice of life anime and manga
Yonkoma
Cross-dressing in anime and manga
Tokyo MX original programming